Another Day is a 2001 American-Canadian romantic drama film directed by Jeffrey Reiner and starring Shannen Doherty, Julian McMahon, and Max Martini. It was written by Don MacLeod and Helen Frost. It was produced by Eric Norlen and Jean Desormeaux, and released as a television film. It received 53% on Rotten Tomatoes.

Plot
Kate has been working a job she doesn't like and saving up to go to medical school. She discovers she's pregnant. Her boyfriend is of good conduct, but she and her boyfriend Paul disagree with her decision not to settle down. She drives all day to David's place, her best friend since childhood. She learns the next day that Paul has died in a factory fire. She reaches the factory. It appears as though Paul ought not have been at the factory and appears suicidal. Years later Kate has moved on with her life and her new boyfriend is David. She has chosen to raise the child who has grown to be a four-year-old whom she has named Meghan after her mother. Kate gets admission to an accounting school. David asks her why she's settled for accountancy when she wanted to go to medical school. They have a minor argument in which she accuses David didn't do much with his life either. Kate and David are getting over up by the Meghan plays too close to the river. David talks about conversations he's had with her that Kate doesn't remember. Meghan is swept away by the river current. David jumps into the gushing current to save her. Kate follows and jumps in too. Kate gets separated.

Kate is then swept ashore and saved by the river patrol police. She awakens to discover that she has gone back in time to before Paul's accident. She slowly gets used to the time when David is still her friend and Paul is her boyfriend. She extracts a promise from Paul to never go near the factory and to marry her soon. Paul leaves early the next morning in his river boat to go to his retreat to have time to himself to think it over. David and Kate get worried and go off in search of him. They do not find him, but during the excursion she learns that David wanted to make it big by selling art in the big city. She discovers David has feelings for her when he says he's not going to miss anything if he dies, but he's terrified of what he misses if he lives. On the way she asks to be dropped at the factory. David returns home, and tells a frantic Paul she's at the factory. Paul goes to get her. At the factory Kate discovers the fire was started by an acquaintance who works for security at the factory on account of negligence by lighting a cigarette on premises. She gets hurt as the fire intensifies with explosions. Paul arrives, however he gets fatally hurt by shrapnel as more blasts occur. Kate tries to drag Paul, but eventually has to save her own life. She sees her other self arrive from the factory windows. Her memory fades and the next thing she knows is that she's in the water.

Kate is again swept ashore. The river patrol police find her. She awakens and knows that she is back in her own time and understands all. David confirms that Meghan is safe. She confronts the acquaintance, and he asks her why she didn't tell anyone. Kate has now learned that one cannot change the past but one can decide how to live for the future and moves on to living happy with David and Meghan.

Cast
 Shannen Doherty as Kate
 Julian McMahon as David
 Max Martini as Paul
Courtney Kidd as Meghan
David Ferry as Ray
Kristina Nicoll as Gabby
Chad Bruce as Ian

Release dates

References

External links
 https://web.archive.org/web/20110622021250/http://movies.yahoo.com/movie/1810108157/details
 https://www.imdb.com/title/tt0295172/
 https://www.amazon.com/Another-Day-Shannen-Doherty/dp/B002GLG5PA/ref=cm_cr_pr_product_top
rottentomatoes - Another Day
themoviescene - themoviescene
 https://www.rottentomatoes.com/m/another_day
 http://www.bfi.org.uk/films-tv-people/4ce2b8af2da79

2001 films
2001 romantic drama films
2001 television films
Canadian romantic drama films
Canadian drama television films
American romantic drama films
American drama television films
2000s English-language films
Films directed by Jeffrey Reiner
2000s American films
2000s Canadian films